The Producers Guild Film Award for Best Actress in a Leading Role (previously known as the Apsara Award for Best Actress in a Leading Role) is given by the producers of the film and television guild as part of its annual award ceremony for Hindi films, to recognise a female actor who has delivered an outstanding performance in a leading role. Following its inception in 2004, no one was awarded in 2005 and 2007.

† - indicates the performance also won the Filmfare Award
‡ - indicates the performance was also nominated for the Filmfare Award

Superlatives

Vidya Balan and Priyanka Chopra, with three wins each, have more Best Actress wins than any other actress. Followed by Deepika Padukone with two wins.

Two actresses have won the award in consecutive years; in chronological order, they are Priyanka Chopra (2009-10) and Vidya Balan (2011–13).

There has been only one tie in the history of this category. This occurred in 2011 when Anushka Sharma and Vidya Balan were both given the award.

Deepika Padukone, holds the record for most nominations in the Best Actress category, with 8, followed by Priyanka Chopra (7). 

Deepika Padukone and Priyanka Chopra are the overall most-nominated performers in the female acting categories, with 8 nominations overall. Deepika having 8 for Best Actress, and Priyanka having 7 for Best Actress and 1 for Best Supporting Actress. Deepika Padukone also holds the record for most consecutive year nominations with 7 between 2013 and 2016, being nominated thrice in 2014 and twice in 2016.

Deepika Padukone who received three out of the six nominations of this category in 2014 (and eventually won for Chennai Express), holds the record for the highest number of Best Actress nominations in a single year.

Only once have two actresses been nominated for the same film: Deepika Padukone and Priyanka Chopra for Bajirao Mastani (2015)

Kangana Ranaut is the only actress to be nominated twice for the same role; she was nominated for her role as Tanuja "Tanu" Trivedi in 2012 and 2016

Only once have cousins been nominated for the Best Actress Award during the same year: Parineeti Chopra and Priyanka Chopra in 2013.

Multiple nominees
 8 Nominations : Deepika Padukone
 7 Nominations : Priyanka Chopra
 5 Nominations : Rani Mukerji
 4 Nominations : Vidya Balan, Kareena Kapoor Khan
 3 Nominations : Urmila Matondkar, Aishwarya Rai Bachchan, Anushka Sharma, Kangana Ranaut
 2 Nominations : Parineeti Chopra, Alia Bhatt

Winners and nominees
Winners are listed first in bold, followed by the other nominees.

2000s

2010s

See also
Producers Guild Film Awards
Producers Guild Film Award for Best Actor in a Leading Role

Producers Guild Film Awards
Film awards for lead actress